Dresden Grenzstraße station is a railway station in Dresden-Klotzsche, Germany. The station is located on the Dresden-Klotzsche–Dresden Flughafen railway. The train services are operated by Deutsche Bahn, as part of the Dresden S-Bahn.

Train services
The following services currently call at the station:

Dresden S-Bahn services  Dresden Flughafen – Dresden – Pirna

References

External links

Grenzstrasse
DresdenGrenzstr